Tiny Toon Adventures is an American animated television series created by Tom Ruegger that was broadcast from September 14, 1990, to December 6, 1992. It was the first animated series produced by Steven Spielberg's Amblin Television in association with Warner Bros. Animation. The show follows the adventures of a group of young cartoon characters who attend Acme Looniversity to become the next generation of characters from the Looney Tunes series.

The pilot episode, "The Looney Beginning", aired as a prime-time special on CBS on September 14, 1990, while the series itself was featured in first-run syndication for the first two seasons. The final season was aired on Fox Kids. The series ended production in 1992 in favor of Animaniacs, which premiered a year later; however, two specials were produced in 1994. A reboot series, Tiny Toons Looniversity, was announced in October 2020.

Premise

Setting
Tiny Toon Adventures is a cartoon set in the fictional town of "Acme Acres", where most of the Tiny Toons and Looney Tunes characters live. The characters attend "Acme Looniversity", a school whose faculty primarily consists of the mainstays of the classic Warner Bros. cartoons, such as Bugs Bunny, Daffy Duck, Porky Pig, Sylvester the Cat, Wile E. Coyote and Elmer Fudd. In the series, the university is founded to teach cartoon characters how to become funny. The school is not featured in every episode, as not all of its storylines revolve around the school.

Like Looney Tunes, the series makes use of cartoon violence (e.g. anvils falling on someone, liberal use of explosives) and slapstick. The series parodies and references the current events of the early 1990s and Hollywood culture. Occasionally, episodes delve into veiled ethical and morality stories of ecology, self-esteem, and crime.

Characters

The series centers on a group of young cartoon characters who attend a school called Acme Looniversity to be the next generation of Looney Tunes characters. Most of the Tiny Toons characters were designed to resemble younger versions of Warner Bros.' most popular Looney Tunes animal characters by exhibiting similar traits and looks. The four main characters are Babs Bunny, a pink female rabbit, Buster Bunny, a blue male rabbit not related to Babs, Plucky Duck, a green male duck and Hamton J. Pig, a pink male pig. Other major characters in the cast are generally nonhuman as well. These include Fifi La Fume, a purple-and-white female skunk; Shirley the Loon, a white female loon; Dizzy Devil, a purple tasmanian devil; Furrball, a blue cat; Sweetie Pie, a pink canary; Calamity Coyote, a bluish-gray coyote; Little Beeper, a red-orange roadrunner; and Gogo Dodo, a zany green dodo. Two human characters, Montana Max and Elmyra Duff, are regarded as the main villains of the series and also are students of Acme Looniversity. As villains, Elmyra is seen as an extreme pet lover while Montana Max is a spoiled rich brat who owns either many toys or polluting factories. Supporting characters included Li'l Sneezer, a gray mouse with powerful sneezes; Concord Condor, a purple condor; Byron Basset, a usually sleeping basset hound; Bookworm, a pink worm with glasses; Arnold the Pit Bull, a muscular white pit bull; Fowlmouth, a white rooster with horrid language; Barky Marky, a brown dog, and Mary Melody, an African American girl.

Feeding off the characters are the more traditional Looney Tunes such as Bugs Bunny, Daffy Duck, and Porky Pig among others. Most of the adults teach classes at Acme Looniversity and serve as mentors to the Tiny Toons while others fill secondary positions as needed.

Production

Development
According to writer Paul Dini, Tiny Toons originated as an idea by Terry Semel, the then-president of Warner Bros., who wanted to "inject new life into the Warner Bros. Animation department", and at the same time create a series with junior versions of Looney Tunes characters. Semel proposed that the new series would be a show based on Looney Tunes where the characters were either young versions of the original Looney Tunes and Merrie Melodies characters or new characters as the offspring of the original characters. The idea of a series with the basis of younger and junior versions of cartoon characters was common at the time; the era in which Tiny Toons was produced for had such cartoons as Muppet Babies, A Pup Named Scooby-Doo (which Ruegger worked on), Tom & Jerry Kids and The Flintstones Kids. Warner Bros. chose to do the same because Spielberg wanted to make a series similar to Looney Tunes, as series producer/show-runner Tom Ruegger explained: "Well, I think in Warner Bros. case, they had the opportunity to work with Steven Spielberg] on a project [...] But he didn't want to just work on characters that Chuck Jones, Friz Freleng, Bob McKimson and Bob Clampett made famous and created. He wanted to be involved with the creation of some new characters." The result was a series similar to Looney Tunes without the use of the same characters.

On January 20, 1987, the Warner Bros. Animation studio approached Steven Spielberg to collaborate with Semel and Warner Bros. head of licensing Dan Romanelli on Semel's ideas. They eventually decided that the new characters would be similar to the Looney Tunes characters with no direct relation. However, Tiny Toons did not go into production then, nor was it even planned to be made for television; the series initially was to be a theatrical feature-length film.

On December 27, 1988, Tiny Toons was changed from a film to a television series, with Jean MacCurdy overseeing production of the first 65 episodes. MacCurdy said that Tiny Toons was changed to a television series to "reach a broader audience". For the series, MacCurdy hired Tom Ruegger, who previously wrote cartoons for Filmation and Hanna-Barbera, to be a producer. In January 1989, Ruegger and writer Wayne Kaatz began developing the characters and the setting of "Acme Acres" with Spielberg.

On January 9, 1989, Warner Bros. Animation chose its voice actors from over 1,200 auditions and put together its 100-person production staff. On April 13, 1989, full production of series episodes began with five overseas animation houses and a total budget of $25 million. The first 65 episodes of the series aired in syndication on 135 stations, beginning in September 1990. During that time, Tiny Toons was a huge success and got higher ratings than its Disney Afternoon competitors in some markets. After a successful run in syndication, Fox attained the rights for season 3. Production of the series halted in late 1992 to make way for Animaniacs to air the following year.

Writers
The series and the show's characters were developed by series producer, head writer and cartoonist Tom Ruegger, division leader Jean MacCurdy, associate producer and artist Alfred Gimeno and story editor/writer Wayne Kaatz. Among the first writers on the series were Jim Reardon, Tom Minton, and Eddie Fitzgerald. Other writers included Arleen Sorkin.  The character and scenery designers included Alfred Gimeno, Ken Boyer, Dan Haskett, Karen Haskett, and many other artists and directors. The series was actually planned to be a feature film. Once Steven Spielberg was attached, numerous things changed, including the idea of turning the movie into a television series.

"Buster and Babs Go Hawaiian" was co-written by three then-teenage girls who were fans of the show.

Casting info
Voice director Andrea Romano auditioned over 1,200 voices for the series and chose more than a dozen main voice actors. The role of Buster Bunny was given to Charlie Adler, who gave the role, as producer Tom Ruegger said, "a great deal of energy". The role of Babs Bunny was given to Tress MacNeille. Writer Paul Dini said that MacNeille was good for the role because she could do both Babs' voice and the voices of her impressions. Voice actors Joe Alaskey and Don Messick were given the roles of Plucky Duck and Hamton J. Pig, respectively. Danny Cooksey played Montana Max and, according to Paul Dini, was good for the role because he could do a "tremendous mean voice." Cooksey was also the only voice actor in the cast who was not an adult. Cree Summer played the roles of Elmyra Duff and Mary Melody; former Saturday Night Live cast member Gail Matthius played Shirley the Loon, and Kath Soucie had the roles of Fifi La Fume and Li'l Sneezer. Other actors for the series included Maurice LaMarche as the voice of Dizzy Devil; Candi Milo as the voice of Sweetie, Frank Welker as the voice of Gogo Dodo, Furrball, Byron Basset, Calamity Coyote, Little Beeper, Barky Marky, and other voices; and Rob Paulsen as the voice of Fowlmouth, Arnold the Pit Bull, Concord Condor, and other characters. The legendary original voice actor behind the Looney Tunes, Mel Blanc, was initially set to reprise his roles as the classic characters, but due to his death in July 1989, his characters were recast to Alaskey, Jeff Bergman, Greg Burson, Bob Bergen, and Mel's son, Noel Blanc.

During production of the series' third season, Adler left the show due to a feud with the producers. Adler was angry that he had not been offered a role in Animaniacs while voice actors with smaller roles in Tiny Toon Adventures such as Paulsen, LaMarche, and Welker were given starring roles in the new series. John Kassir replaced Adler for the remainder of the show's run (although Adler would eventually return to voice Buster in the cancelled video game, Tiny Toon Adventures: Defenders of the Universe). Alaskey, the voice of Plucky Duck, briefly left Tiny Toons for financial reasons, but returned when an agreement was reached with the studio.

Animation
In order to complete 65 episodes for the first season, Warner Bros. Animation and Amblin Television contracted several different North American and international animation houses. These animation studios included Tokyo Movie Shinsha (now known as TMS Entertainment), Wang Film Productions, Morning Sun Animation, AKOM, Freelance Animators New Zealand, Encore Cartoons, StarToons, and Kennedy Cartoons. Tokyo Movie Shinsha also animated the series' opening sequence. Some of the Warner Bros. staff disliked working with Kennedy Cartoons due to the animation studio's inconsistent quality, and episodes that they animated were often subject to multiple re-takes. In other cases, such as the debut episode "The Looney Beginning", portions of Kennedy Cartoons-animated episodes were re-animated by another animation studio. Kennedy Cartoons was actually dropped after the end of the series' first season.

Tiny Toon Adventures was made with a higher production value than standard television animation. It had a cel count that was more than double that of most animated television shows then. The series had about 25,000 cels per episode instead of the standard 10,000, making it unique in that characters moved more fluidly. Pierre DeCelles, an animation producer, described storyboarding for the series as "fun but a big challenge because I always had a short schedule, and it's not always easy to work full blast nonstop".

Music
During the development of the show Steven Spielberg said that Warner Bros. would use a full orchestra, which some thought too expensive and impossible, but they ended up agreeing. Warner Bros. selected Bruce Broughton to write the theme tune (for which he would win a Daytime Emmy along with Tom Ruegger and Wayne Kaatz, who both worked with Broughton on the lyrics) and serve as music supervisor. Screen credits for the composers were given based on the amount of music composed for, or composed and reused in, the episode.

Twenty-six other composers were contracted to create original dramatic underscore for each different episode during the series run: Julie and Steve Bernstein, Steven Bramson, Don Davis, John Debney, Ron Grant, Les Hooper, Carl Johnson, Elliot Kaplan, Arthur Kempel, Ralph Kessler, Albert Lloyd Olson, Hummie Mann, Dennis McCarthy, Joel McNeely, Peter Myers, Laurence Rosenthal, William Ross, Arthur B. Rubinstein, J. Eric Schmidt, David Slonaker, Fred Steiner, Morton Stevens, Richard Stone, Stephen James Taylor and Mark Watters. The composers conducted their own music. Of these composers, Broughton, Bramson, Davis, Olson, Stone, Taylor and Watters wrote the score to Tiny Toon Adventures: How I Spent My Vacation.

These composers would later write the musical scores for shows including Animaniacs and The Sylvester & Tweety Mysteries.

Episodes

Films and television specials
A feature-length film was released direct-to-video in 1992, entitled Tiny Toon Adventures: How I Spent My Vacation. This was later re-edited and aired as part of the series. The length of the movie is 79 minutes. Fox aired It's a Wonderful Tiny Toons Christmas Special in prime time on December 6, 1992. This episode is a parody of It’s a Wonderful Life. Although the Christmas episode is called a special, it is only called this as it is Christmas-themed and is just a regular episode. The Tiny Toon Spring Break Special was aired on Fox during prime time on March 27, 1994. Fox aired Tiny Toons' Night Ghoulery in prime time on May 28, 1995.

Spin-offs

In 1992, The Plucky Duck Show was produced as a spin-off for Fox Kids, based on the character Plucky Duck. Except for the premiere episode, "The Return of Batduck", the show was consisted entirely of recycled Plucky-centric episodes from Tiny Toon Adventures.

In 1998, a second spin-off, entitled Pinky, Elmyra & the Brain, premiered on Kids' WB. This series featured the character Elmyra Duff as well as Pinky and the Brain, two other characters who were originally on Animaniacs before receiving their own spin-off series, also entitled Pinky and the Brain. Pinky, Elmyra & the Brain picks up after Pinky and the Brain leaves off where Pinky and the Brain become Elmyra's pets after Brain accidentally destroys their original home, ACME Labs, during an experiment. Pinky, Elmyra & the Brain lasted for 13 episodes.

Reception
The show was received with positive reviews; the Philadelphia Daily News remarked "It's the most cinematic first-run animated show on TV, mixing long shots, extra-tight closeups and odd perspectives for comic effect..." Citizens' Voice noted "Combining the animation of Warner Bros. and the creative direction of Spielberg, the collection of 65 half-hour cartoons is sure to make a big impression during the weekday late afternoon viewing period..." However, The Journal News criticized about the series "Adults looking for the smart-aleck attitude and wit of the old Warner Bros. classics will be disappointed, however; these are aimed squarely at kids and reflect a '90s sensibility, sneaking pro-social messages into madcap adventure stories."

Awards and nominations

|-
| rowspan="3" | 1991
| rowspan="8" | Daytime Emmy Awards
| Outstanding Animated Program
| Steven Spielberg, Tom Ruegger, Ken Boyer, Art Leonardi, Art Vitello, Paul Dini, and Sherri Stoner
| 
| 
|-
| Outstanding Music Direction and Composition
| William Ross for "Fields of Honey"
| 
| 
|-
| Outstanding Original Song
| Bruce Broughton, Wayne Kaatz, and Tom Ruegger for the main title theme
| 
| 
|-
| rowspan="3" | 1992
| Outstanding Animated Program
| Steven Spielberg, Tom Ruegger, Sherri Stoner, Rich Arons, and Art Leonardi
| 
| 
|-
| Outstanding Music Direction and Composition
| Mark Watters for "The Love Disconnection"
| 
| 
|-
| Outstanding Writing in an Animated Program
| Nicholas Hollander, Tom Ruegger, Paul Dini, and Sherri Stoner
| 
| 
|-
| rowspan="2" | 1993
| Outstanding Animated Program
| Steven Spielberg, Tom Ruegger, Sherri Stoner, Rich Arons, Byron Vaughns, Ken Boyer, Alfred Gimeno, and David West
| 
| 
|-
| Outstanding Music Direction and Composition
| Steven Bramson for “The Horror of Slumber Party Mountain”
| 
| 
|-
| 1992
| rowspan="2" | Annie Awards
| rowspan="2" | Animated Television Program
|
| 
| 
|-
| 1993
|
| 
| 
|-
| 1991
| Primetime Emmy Awards
| Outstanding Animated Program
| Steven Spielberg, Tom Ruegger, Paul Dini, Sherri Stoner, Dave Marshall, Glen Kennedy, Rich Aarons (for episode "The Looney Beginning")
| 
| 
|-
| 1989/1990
| rowspan="2" | Young Artist Awards
| Best New Cartoon Series
| Tiny Toon Adventures
| 
| 
|-
| 1991–1992
| Outstanding Young Voice-Over in an Animated Series or Special
| Whitby Hertford
| 
| 
|-
| 1991
| Environmental Media Awards
| Children’s Television Program – Animated
| episode "Whales Tales"
| 
| 

In January 2009, IGN named Tiny Toons as the 41st in their Top 100 Animated TV Shows list.

Merchandise

Print
Tiny Toon Adventures Magazine, a quarterly children's magazine based on the series, debuted in October 1990. Issues #1–4 were published by DC Comics, and issues #5–7 were released by Welsh Publishing Group. The final issue was cover-dated Spring 1992. Also, various storybooks were published by the Little Golden Book company, including a few episode adaptations and some original stories (Lost in the Fun House and Happy Birthday, Babs!). Tiny Toon Adventures also had a comic book series made by Warner Bros. and DC. The characters also made occasional cameo appearances in the Animaniacs, Freakazoid! and Pinky and the Brain comic books.

Toys and video games

Since its debut, numerous video games based on Tiny Toons have been released. There have been no less than nine titles based on the series released after its original television run and as recently as 2002. Many companies have held the development and publishing rights for the games, including Konami (during the 1990s), Atari, NewKidCo, Conspiracy Games, Warthog, Terraglyph Interactive Studios, and Treasure. Toys for the series included plush dolls and plastic figures, primarily made by Playskool.

Home media
Tiny Toon Adventures: How I Spent My Vacation was released on DVD on August 21, 2012. There are currently no plans to release the two specials (Spring Break and Night Ghoulery) on DVD. In the early to mid-1990s, Warner Bros. had released several videos, including Tiny Toon Adventures: How I Spent My Vacation (a direct-to-video release which later aired as a four-part TV episode), Best of Buster and Babs, Two-Tone Town, Tiny Toons: Big Adventures, Tiny Toons: Island Adventures, Tiny Toons: Music Television, Tiny Toons: Fiendishly Funny Adventures, Tiny Toons: Night Ghoulery and It's a Wonderful Tiny Toons Christmas Special.

Tiny Toons Looniversity
A reboot, Tiny Toons Looniversity, was announced on October 28, 2020,  through the Amblin Entertainment website. It was ordered for two seasons, with each episode running 30 minutes. As with the original series, Steven Spielberg will return to his role as executive producer. Sam Register, Darryl Frank, and Justin Falvey will also be serving as executive producers, while Erin Gibson will be the showrunner and co-executive producer. The series will premiere on HBO Max, and simulcast on Cartoon Network in 2023.

The reboot's first piece of concept art showed Buster Bunny and Babs Bunny, redesigned with different clothes and a new art style. 

Tom Ascheim, then-current president of Cartoon Network, was quoted saying. "Tiny Toons Looniversity will capture all the clever, subversive and smart humor that made Tiny Toon Adventures such a standout series. Fans old and new will love to laugh at and with these characters all over again."

Shortly after the reboot's announcement, it was reported that several of the original voice actors were not going to be involved in the series. Cree Summer had revealed she was informed that Elmyra Duff was excluded. Additionally, Charlie Adler was not approached to reprise his role as Buster, nor was Maurice LaMarche as Dizzy Devil.

However, during an interview on July 12, 2021, Candi Milo said she would be returning to voice Granny but it currently remains uncertain if she will be reprising Sweetie Bird. A few days later, on July 15, Jeff Bergman confirmed that he would be returning to the series as well, voicing Bugs Bunny, Sylvester and Foghorn Leghorn. He went into detail on the characters' roles in the series, explaining Foghorn would occupy as Acme Looniversity's coach, while Bugs would take on a "Dumbledore-like" personality. He also confirmed recording sessions had begun.

On July 9, 2022, it was announced that Tiny Toons Looniversity would be part of the Looney Tunes panel at San Diego Comic-Con 2022. On July 22, it was revealed that Ashleigh Crystal Hairston would be voicing Babs, instead of Tress MacNeille. Numerous pieces of concept art were shown, revealing a revamped Acme Looniversity and its interiors. This also confirmed many of the original series' major characters would be returning, some with updated appearances. Most notably, Elmyra was included in one of these pictures, disproving the claims of her removal. Some have suggested this meant Elmyra was added back at some point or was always intended to appear, but will be recast with a different voice actress, instead of Summer. Spielberg referred to the series as "the best iteration of Tiny Toons he'd ever seen".

Len Kiraly and showrunner Erin Gibson confirmed that Buster and Babs would be presented as twin siblings in the reboot, as opposed to best friends. This decision was criticized by fans of the original series. A July 2022 interview had crew members giving more details. They revealed the series was going to bring back all of the characters from the original show, "down to Arnold the Pit Bull". They also hinted at an episode which takes place in outer space. Gibson provided an explanation behind the choice to make Buster and Babs related, saying, "They’re fraternal twins, which was not an original plot point. I wanted to dive into a brother/sister relationship that looked really symbiotic and collaborative and supportive, not antagonistic. Seeing two people who are really on the same page, and then how do people who are so close make new friends? You know, find out who they are by these new relationships — these new college experiences while still having fun and doing the dumbest stuff you’ll ever see on TV, but having story and plot points and character development." Nate Cash added, "And they look up to the faculty, they’re established Tunes who are like their gods, but then they’re like, 'Who am I?' and 'What’s my voice?' — which is a cool place to develop them as their own characters and not just mini versions of their counterparts."

References

External links

 
 Tiny Toon Adventures at The Big Cartoon DataBase
  at Don Markstein's Toonopedia

 
1990s American animated television series
1990s American daily animated television series
1990s American satirical television series
1990s American surreal comedy television series
1990 American television series debuts
1992 American television series endings
American children's animated adventure television series
American children's animated comedy television series
American children's animated fantasy television series
American children's animated musical television series
Crossover animated television series
Daytime Emmy Award for Outstanding Animated Program winners
English-language television shows
First-run syndicated television programs in the United States
Fox Kids
Kids' WB original shows
Looney Tunes
Looney Tunes television series
Self-reflexive television
Television series by Amblin Entertainment
Television series by Warner Bros. Animation
Television series by Warner Bros. Television Studios
Television series created by Tom Ruegger
Television shows adapted into comics
Television shows adapted into video games
Animated television series about rabbits and hares
Metafictional television series
Teen animated television series